Go for It 1983 was a various artists "hits" collection album released in Australia in 1983 (Cat No. GO 1). The album spent 1 week at the top of the Australian album charts in 1983.

Track listing

Side 1
"Living on the Ceiling" – Blancmange
"Hey Little Girl" – Icehouse
"Love My Way" – The Psychedelic Furs
"Do You Really Want to Hurt Me" – Culture Club
"Zoom" – Fat Larry's Band
"The Traveller" – Big Red
"Jackie Wilson Said (I'm in Heaven When You Smile)" – Dexys Midnight Runners
"Stand Up" – The Angels
"Peek-a-Boo" – Devo

Side 2
"Gloria" – Laura Branigan
"Down the Line" – Mi-Sex
"Shock the Monkey" – Peter Gabriel
"Don't Change" – INXS
"Back on the Chain Gang" – The Pretenders
"Twisting by the Pool" – Dire Straits
"Close Again" – Mental as Anything
"Africa" – Toto
"Truly" – Lionel Richie

Charts

Certifications and sales

References

1983 compilation albums
Pop compilation albums
Rock compilation albums